is a Japanese voice actor and narrator from Hyōgo Prefecture, Japan. He is currently affiliated with Aoni Production.

He is most known for being voices for Kicchō Fukuda in Slam Dunk, Auron in Final Fantasy X, Itachi Uchiha in Naruto, Squall Leonhart in Final Fantasy VIII and Kingdom Hearts, Jūshirō Ukitake in Bleach, Pierre de Chaltier in Tales of Destiny and Ryoma Nagare in many of the newer Getter Robo OVAs and Super Robot Wars games.

Filmography

Televsion animation
1993
Slam Dunk as Kicchou Fukuda, Hiroshi Morishige, Tatsumasa Oda, Teruo Ookawa
Sailor Moon R as Driver, Man

1994
Captain Tsubasa J as Makoto Soda
Dragon Ball Z as Monk, Subordinate A

1998
Outlaw Star as Father, Silgrian
Cooking Master Boy as Raihou
Bubblegum Crisis: Tokyo 2040 as Masaki
All Purpose Cultural Cat Girl Nuku Nuku as Eiichi Ikenami
Fancy Lala as Hiroya Aikawa
Record of Lodoss War: Chronicles of the Heroic Knight as Randy
Getter Robo Armageddon as Ryoma Nagare

1999
Gokudo as Hanayo
Bucky - The Incredible Kid as Geki
GTO: Great Teacher Onizuka as Hideo
One Piece as Fullbody

2000
Platinumhugen Ordian as Satoru Tachibana
Gravitation as Tatsuha Uesugi
Muteki-ō Tri-Zenon as Jin Makinohara
Shin Getter Robo vs Neo Getter Robo as Ryoma Nagare

2001
Tales of Eternia as John
The SoulTaker as Umon
Mamimume Mogacho as DJ Mash
Rave Master as Schneider

2003
Avenger as Jade
Tantei Gakuen Q as Kintaro Tooyama
Getbackers as Boss

2004
Naruto as Itachi Uchiha
New Getter Robo as Ryoma Nagare
Gravion Zwei as Ewan

2005
Bleach as Jūshirō Ukitake
Transformers: Cybertron as Dreadlock

2006
La Corda D'Oro: primo passo as Hiroto Kanazawa
Innocent Venus as Toraji Shiba
Death Note as Hideki Ide, Raye Penber
Night Head Genesis as Jin Tanaka
Ring ni Kakero 1: Nichibei Kessen Hen as Kazuki Shinatora
Marginal Prince as Stanislav Sokurov

2007
Naruto: Shippuden as Itachi Uchiha
Kaiji as Funai

2008
Kyōran Kazoku Nikki as Dekamelon
Hell Girl: Three Vessels as Tange Hideto
Fantastic Detective Labyrinth as Kantarou Izumi
Porfy no Nagai Tabi as Cloud
Rin: Daughters of Mnemosyne as Shōgo Shimazaki

2009
La Corda D'Oro ~secondo passo~ as Hiroto Kanazawa
Phantom ~Requiem for the Phantom~ as Issac Wisemel

2010
Tegami Bachi as Dr. Thunderland Jr
Tegami Bachi: Reverse as Dr. Thunderland Jr.
Battle Spirits: Brave as Rahze
Yu-Gi-Oh! 5D's as Z-ONE
Ring ni Kakero 1: Shadow as Kazuki Shinatora

2011
We Without Wings - Under the Innocent Sky as Karuo Karube
Gosick as Wong Kai
Ring ni Kakero 1: Sekai Taikai-hen as Kazuki Shinatora

2012
Senki Zesshō Symphogear as Genjūrō Kazanari
Naruto Spin-Off: Rock Lee & His Ninja Pals as Itachi Uchiha
Aesthetica of a Rogue Hero as Ken'ya Onizuka

2013
Senki Zesshō Symphogear G as Genjūrō Kazanari

2014
La Corda d'Oro Blue Sky as Hōsei Toki
Hero Bank as Ryūga Tennōji
Lord Marksman and Vanadis as Emir

2015
Assassination Classroom as Asano Gakuho
My Love Story!! as Molester 2
Senki Zesshō Symphogear GX as Genjūrō Kazanari
Sengoku Musou as Toyotomi Hideyoshi

2016
Pandora in the Crimson Shell: Ghost Urn as Mr. chicken

2017
Senki Zesshō Symphogear AXZ as Genjūrō Kazanari

2018
JoJo's Bizarre Adventure: Golden Wind as Polpo / Black Sabbath

2019
Senki Zesshō Symphogear XV as Genjūrō Kazanari

2021
Getter Robo Arc as Ryoma Nagare

2022
Uzaki-chan Wants to Hang Out! ω as Fujio Uzaki
Bleach: Thousand-Year Blood War as Jūshirō Ukitake

Original video animation (OVA)
Final Fantasy VII Advent Children (2006) as Cait Sith
Saint Seiya: The Lost Canvas (2008) as Oneiros
Voltage Fighter Gowcaizer (1996) as Ikki Tachibana/Brider 1, Captain Atlantis/Randy Riggs and Platonic Twins/Ryo Asahina
Wild Adapter (xxxx) as Tokito Minoru

Drama CD
Samurai Shodown (1994) as Tam Tam, Ukyo Tachibana
The King of Fighters '94 (1995) as Robert Garcia

Theatrical animation
Road to Ninja: Naruto the Movie (2012) as Itachi Uchiha
Classmates (2016) as Manabu Hara

Video games
Money Puzzle Exchanger (1997) as Blibov Sakata / Mackermocally
Final Fantasy X (2001) as Auron
Kingdom Hearts (2002) as Leon
Ore no Shita de Agake (2002) as Takafumi Higuchi
DreamMix TV World Fighters (2003) as Simon Belmont, Yugo Ogami
Ace Combat 5: The Unsung War (2004) as Alvin H. Davenport
Airforce Delta Strike (2004) as David Smith, Albert Ungar
Kingdom Hearts II (2005) as Leon, Auron
Dirge of Cerberus: Final Fantasy VII (2006) as Cait Sith
Last Escort (2006) as Satoru Kushinoyuki
Naruto: Ultimate Ninja Storm  (2008) as Itachi Uchiha
Dissidia: Final Fantasy (2008) as Squall Leonhart
Tales of Hearts R (2008) as Galando Grinus
Samurai Warriors 3 (2009) as Motonari Mori
Yakuza 4 (2010) as Daisaku Minami
Naruto Shippuden: Ultimate Ninja Storm 2  (2010) as Itachi Uchiha
Dragon Ball: Raging Blast 2 (2010) as Hatchihyakku
Final Fantasy Type-0 (2011) as Qator Bashtar
Naruto Shippuden: Ultimate Ninja Storm Generations  (2012) as Itachi Uchiha
Yakuza 5 (2012) as Kamon Kanai
Time Crisis 5 (2015) as Keith Martin
Super Smash Bros. Ultimate (2018) as Simon Belmont, Mii Fighter Type 9
Kingdom Hearts III Re Mind (2020) as Leon
Live A Live (2022) as Kenichi Matsu
Unknown date
Destrega as Gradd
Dissidia 012 Final Fantasy as Squall Leonhart
Dynasty Warriors 4 as Zhou Tai
Dynasty Warriors 7 as Jia Xu
Final Fantasy Type-0 HD as Qator Bashtar
Final Fantasy X-2 as Auron, Tobli
Kaiser Knuckle (known outside Japan as Global Champion) as Gekkou
Kessen as Ii Naomasa
Kiniro no Corda as Hiroto Kanazawa
Kiniro no Corda 2 as Hiroto Kanazawa
Langrisser I & II as Taylor
Rockman X6 as Rainy Turtloid, Blizzard Wolfang 
Onimusha: Dawn of Dreams as Tenkai Nankobo (Samonosuke Akechi)
Tales of Destiny as Pierre de Chaltier (PS2 remake)
Tales of Eternia as Roen and Gnome
Voltage Fighter Gowcaizer as Captain Atlantis/Randy Riggs and Platonic Twins/Ryo Asahina
Xenosaga as Kevin Winnicot
Yo-Jin-Bo as Tsubaki Tainojō 
Samurai Warriors 2 as Hideyoshi Toyotomi until Spirit of Sanada
Soshite Bokura Wa as Shuhei Aoyama
Super Robot Taisen OG: The Moon Dwellers (2016), Al-Van Lunks
Warriors Orochi 3 as Jia Xu until 4 Ultimate

Drama CD 

110 Ban wa Koi no Hajimari series 1, as Yasuto Fuse
3 Ji Kara Koi wo Suru series 1: 3 Ji Kara Koi wo Suru I, as Ryoutarou Fujishiba
3 Ji Kara Koi wo Suru series 2: 3 Ji Kara Koi wo Suru II, as Ryoutarou Fujishiba
3 Ji Kara Koi wo Suru series 3: 3 Ji Kara Koi wo Suru III, as Ryoutarou Fujishiba
3 Ji Kara Koi wo Suru series 5: 8 Ji Han Kara Fall In Love, as Ryoutarou Fujishiba
Boxer Wa Inu Ni Naru series 1: Boxer Wa Inu Ni Naru, as Abel
Boxer Wa Inu Ni Naru series 2: Doctor Wa Inu wo Kau, as Abel
Boxer Wa Inu Ni Naru series 4: Akuta Wa Inu wo Enjiru, as Abel
Broadcast o Toppatsure!, as Uzuki Kuno
Count Cain, as Cain Hargreaves
Dokyusei, as Manabu Hara
Finder Series, as Feilong
Hameteyaru!, as Kouji
Koi no Series 2: Koi no Seasoning, as Tousui Jougasaki
Koi no Series 3: Koi no Mixing, as Tousui Jougasaki
Rolex ni Kuchizukewo, as Hitoshi Takeuchi
Saikyou no Koibito, as Yuuya Ikuno
Sora to Hara, as Manabu Hara
Sotsugyosei, as Manabu Hara
Wild Adapter, as Tokito Minoru
Yellow, as Go
Yokubo no Vector, as Tatsuro Hasabe

Tokusatsu
Ultraman Tiga (1996) as Irudo (Voice: Kazue Ikura) (ep. 41)
Mirai Sentai Timeranger (2000) as Blackmailing School Gang Leader Flan (ep. 17)
Hyakujuu Sentai Gaoranger (2001) as Duke Org Propela (ep. 32-33)
Kamen Rider Decade (2009) as Ten-Faced Demon Llumu Qhimil (ep. 28-29) 
OOO, Den-O, All Riders: Let's Go Kamen Riders (2011) as Ten-Faced Demon Llumu Qhimil, Inazuman, Shocker Greeed
Kaizoku Sentai Gokaiger (2011) as Zodomas (ep. 4)
Kamen Rider × Kamen Rider Fourze & OOO: Movie War Mega Max (2011) as Kamen Rider Stronger
Kamen Rider × Super Sentai: Super Hero Taisen (2012) as Kamen Rider Hibiki, Doras other
Kamen Rider × Super Sentai × Space Sheriff: Super Hero Taisen Z (2013) as Zanjioh, Sabotegron other
Heisei Riders vs. Shōwa Riders: Kamen Rider Taisen feat. Super Sentai (2014) as Skyrider, General Shadow, General Jark, Ten-Faced Demon other
Ressha Sentai ToQger (2014) as Film Shadow (ep. 39)
Super Hero Taisen GP: Kamen Rider 3 (2015) as Rider Man other
Uchu Sentai Kyuranger (2017) as Gamettsui (ep. 2)

Dubbing roles
2 Days in the Valley as Wes Taylor (Eric Stoltz)
Abraham Lincoln: Vampire Hunter as Abraham Lincoln (Benjamin Walker)
Ghost Ship as Dodge (Ron Eldard)
Thomas & Friends as Rusty (Seasons 4–7), Troublesome Trucks (Season 5), Blue Narrow Gauge Coaches (Season 4), and The Elsbridge Cricket Club (Season 4)

References

External links
  
 
 
 

1969 births
Living people
Aoni Production voice actors
Japanese male video game actors
Japanese male voice actors
Male voice actors from Hyōgo Prefecture
20th-century Japanese male actors
21st-century Japanese male actors